James Myles Hogge (19 April 1873 – 27 October 1928) was a British social researcher and Liberal politician.

Hogge was educated at the Edinburgh Normal School, Moray House School of Education, and the University of Edinburgh, where he was president of the Liberal Association. Hogge at first wanted to be teacher. He began as pupil teacher in Edinburgh and was a 1st class King's Scholar at Moray House Training College, Edinburgh but he then qualified as a preacher in the United Free Church of Scotland. However, after engaging in work in the Edinburgh slums, he changed career again to concentrate on social work and research; first in Edinburgh, then in York with Joseph Rowntree and his son Seebohm. On 4 February 1905, Hogge married Florence Rebecca Metcalfe, a widow from Malton in Yorkshire. They had one son and two daughters.

Political career
Hogge was elected to the York City Council as a Progressive in the Castlegate ward from 1907–1913. He was president of the York City and County Liberal Club and secretary of the Thirsk and Malton Liberal Association. In December 1910, Hogge stood as Liberal candidate in the Camlachie division of Glasgow, losing narrowly to a Liberal Unionist;

The intervention of the women's suffrage candidate, had the effect of ensuring the election of Mackinder, who opposed women's suffrage at the expense of Hogge, who supported it.
He was elected to Parliament at a by-election in February 1912 at Edinburgh East. 

An opponent of the Lloyd George coalition, he was not given the 'coupon' at the general election of 1918 but increased his majority as an independent Liberal. 

From 1919–1920 he was President of the National Association of Discharged Sailors and Soldiers.
He had misgivings about H. H. Asquith's leadership, however, and fell out of favour with the 'Wee Free' party establishment. 

He held his Edinburgh seat until the general election of 1924. 

Hogge died at his home in Hammersmith on 27 October 1928 aged 55.

References

James Myles Hogge in Who was Who, OUP, 2007
James Myles Hogge by Gordon F Millar in Dictionary of National Biography, Oxford 2004–08
The life and career of Liberal MP James Myles Hogge 1873–1928 by Ian Elder: Journal of Liberal History, Issue 30, Spring 2001

External links
The life and career of Liberal MP James Myles Hogge 1873–1928 by Ian Elder: Journal of Liberal History, Issue 30, Spring 2001
 

1873 births
1928 deaths
Members of the Parliament of the United Kingdom for Edinburgh constituencies
Scottish Liberal Party MPs
UK MPs 1910–1918
UK MPs 1918–1922
UK MPs 1922–1923
UK MPs 1923–1924
Alumni of the University of Edinburgh